This is a list of the most common U.S. place names (cities, towns, villages, boroughs and census-designated places [CDP]), with the number of times that name occurs (in parentheses). Some states have more than one occurrence of the same name. Cities with populations over 100,000 are in bold.

Postal Service data
The United States Postal Service has published a list of the most common city and post office names within the United States, as of 2020:

All place names

Washington (91)

 The State of Washington
 31 of the 50 United States are home to a Washington County.
 There are 5 Washington Townships (and one Washington Borough) in the State of New Jersey.
 There are 7 Towns of Washington (and one Town of Port Washington) in the State of Wisconsin which correspond to townships rather than municipalities.
 Louisiana is home to both a village/town of Washington, and a Washington Parish (equivalent to a county in most other states)

Franklin (45)

Clinton (39)

Arlington (38)

Centerville (38)

Lebanon (35)

Georgetown (35)

(34)

Chester (32)

Fairview (32)

Greenville (31)

Bristol (29)

Dayton (28)

Dover (28)

Madison (29)

Salem (27)

Winchester (27)

Oakland (27)

Milton (25)

Newport (25)

Ashland (24)

Bloomington (24)

Riverside (25)

Manchester (23)

Oxford (23)

Burlington (22)

Jackson (23)

Milford (21)

Clayton (20)

Kingston (20)

Auburn (19)

Lexington (19)

Mount Vernon (19)

Cleveland (18)

Hudson (19)

See also
 List of cities in the United States
 List of places named Peoria
 List of United States cities by population
 The 250 places named Washington Township

References

Lists of cities in the United States
United States
Lists of populated places in the United States
Place names
Names of places in the United States

af:Stede van Verenigde State van Amerika
eo:Listo de urboj de Usono
fr:Liste des villes aux États-Unis d'Amérique
io:Listo di urbi en Usa
it:Città degli Stati Uniti d'America
fi:Luettelo Yhdysvaltain kaupungeista